Chase Buchanan and Blaž Rola were the defending champions but chose not to defend their title.

Philip Bester and Peter Polansky won the title after defeating Stefan Kozlov and Austin Krajicek 6–2, 6–2 in the final.

Seeds

Draw

References
 Main Draw
 Qualifying Draw

Cary Challenger - Doubles
2016 Doubles